Reedgrass may refer to:

Alpine reedgrass (Calamagrostis purpurascens)
Bluejoint reedgrass (Calamagrostis canadensis)
Bolander's reedgrass (Calamagrostis bolanderi)
Fire reedgrass (Calamagrostis koelerioides)
Leafy reedgrass (Calamagrostis foliosa)
Serpentine reedgrass (Calamagrostis ophitidis)